Legrandite is a rare zinc arsenate mineral, Zn2(AsO4)(OH)·(H2O). 

It is an uncommon secondary mineral in the oxidized zone of arsenic bearing zinc deposits and occurs rarely in granite pegmatite. Associated minerals include: adamite, paradamite, köttigite, scorodite, smithsonite, leiteite, renierite, pharmacosiderite, aurichalcite, siderite, goethite and pyrite. It  has been reported from Tsumeb, Namibia; the Ojuela mine in Durango, Mexico and at Sterling Hill, New Jersey, US.

It was first described in 1934 for an occurrence in the Flor de Peña Mine, Nuevo León, Mexico and named after M. Legrand, a  Belgian mining engineer .

References

Zinc minerals
Arsenate minerals
Monoclinic minerals
Minerals in space group 14
Minerals described in 1934